WHG may refer to:
Walsall Housing Group, United Kingdom
"Warehousing Godown", see Tamil Nadu Civil Supplies Corporation
in German law, Wasserhaushaltsgesetz, see Impoundment rights
Wellcome Centre for Human Genetics
Western Hunter-Gatherers, component in the population genetics of Europe